Credence Hospital is a multispecialty hospital in Thiruvananthapuram, Kerala, India.

Credence Hospital, started as one of the biggest centers for Assisted Reproduction in South India in 2001, provided medical care, and evolved over the years into South India's first comprehensive multispecialty hospital for women.

In January 2006, Credence Hospital expanded and relaunched itself as a superspecialty Women's Health Institute and Research Center. 
Right from basic specialties such as Internal Medicine, Obstetrics & Gynecology and General Surgery, to specialties such as Plastic Surgery, Gastroenterology, Neurology, Orthopedics, ENT, Cardiology, Dermatology, Psychiatry, Ophthalmology, Physiotherapy, Pediatrics, Urology and Radiology, the hospital also has super-specialty departments like Neonatology, Genetics, Reproductive Medicine, Advanced Endoscopy and Fetal Medicine. The hospital, in addition, provides concepts such as Intrauterine fetal therapy, cord-blood banking and advanced genetics, services which were hitherto unavailable in Trivandrum.

References

External links 
 Credence Hospital website

Hospital buildings completed in 2001
Hospitals in Thiruvananthapuram
2001 establishments in Kerala